Tmesisternus postfasciatus is a species of beetle in the family Cerambycidae. It was described by Stephan von Breuning and De Jong in 1941. It is known from Papua New Guinea.

Subspecies
 Tmesisternus postfasciatus postmaculatus Breuning & De Jong, 1941
 Tmesisternus postfasciatus postfasciatus Breuning & De Jong, 1941

References

postfasciatus
Beetles described in 1941